The Grands Lacs Company was a concession company of the Congo Free State.

References

Bibliography

Belgian colonisation in Africa
History of the Democratic Republic of the Congo
Congo Free State